8.6 mm Blackout (8.6×43 mm), also sometimes referred to as 8.6 BLK or 8.6 Creedmoor, is a centerfire rifle cartridge developed by the firearms manufacturer Q, LLC. It utilizes a shortened case from the 6.5mm Creedmoor necked up to an 8.6 mm caliber (8.585 mm or 0.338 in diameter) projectile and designed for use in bolt action rifles or as a caliber conversion for AR10 and AR-308 rifles.

See also 
 .300 AAC Blackout

References

Pistol and rifle cartridges